Herald Shively "Tiny" Piper (January 13, 1905 – May 30, 1954) was an American football and college basketball coach. He served as the head football coach at Chapman University in Chapman, California from 1923 to 1926. He also served as the school's head men's basketball coach from 1922 to 1925.

References

External links
 

1905 births
1954 deaths
Basketball coaches from Kansas
Chapman Panthers football coaches
Chapman Panthers men's basketball coaches
People from Crawford County, Kansas